Nevan J. Krogan is a Canadian molecular and systems biologist. He is a professor and the Director of the Quantitative Biosciences Institute (QBI) at the University of California San Francisco (UCSF), as well as a senior investigator at the J. David Gladstone Institutes.

Krogan’s research focuses on developing and using unbiased, quantitative systems approaches to study a wide variety of diseases with the ultimate goal of developing new therapeutics. He has authored over 300 papers in the field of molecular biology and has given over 350 lectures and seminars around the world.

Early life and education 
Krogan was born in Regina, Saskatchewan, Canada. He obtained his undergraduate degree in chemistry in 1997 and his M.Sc. in biology in 1999 from the University of Regina. Krogan received his Ph.D. in medical genetics at the University of Toronto in 2006 with Jack Greenblatt as his doctoral advisor. During his PhD, he explored the combination of protein-protein and genetic interaction data sets.

Career 
Krogan became a Sandler Fellow in 2006 at UCSF, an assistant professor in 2007, and a full professor in 2011. He also became an investigator at the Gladstone Institutes in 2011. He was appointed director of the Quantitative Biosciences Institutes at UCSF in March 2016.

Krogan serves as Director of The HARC Center, an NIH-funded collaborative group that focuses on the structural characterization of HIV-human protein complexes. Krogan is also the co-Director of three Cell Mapping initiatives, the Cancer Cell Mapping Initiative (CCMI), the Host Pathogen Map Initiative (HPMI) and the Psychiatric Cell Map Initiative (PCMI). These initiatives map the gene and protein networks in healthy and diseased cells with these maps being used to better understand disease and provide novel therapies to fight them.

In 2020, Krogan led the work to create the SARS-CoV-2 interactome and assembled the QBI Coronavirus Research Group (QCRG) to study SARS-CoV-2 and to find treatments for Covid-19.

Philanthropy 
In 2021, Krogan contributed $2.08 million to the University of Regina, the largest donation in the university’s history, in order to help ten Haitian students attend post-secondary in Regina. For this, he has worked alongside the Children of Haiti Project.

Awards and honors 
2004 – Hannah Farkas-Himsley and Alexander Memorial Award
2005 – L. W. Macpherson Microbiology Award
2008 – Top 25 authors of high-impact papers in molecular biology and genetics from 2002 to 2006
2009-2012 – Searle Scholar, Searle Foundation
2009-2014 – Keck Distinguished Young Scholar, W. M. Keck Foundation
2017 – The Roddenberry Prize, Roddenberry Foundation

References 

Year of birth missing (living people)
Living people
Canadian molecular biologists
21st-century Canadian biologists
University of California, San Francisco faculty
University of California, San Francisco alumni
University of Regina alumni
University of Toronto alumni